Karthick Naren (born 23 July 1994) is an Indian filmmaker who works in Tamil cinema. Naren broke into the Tamil film industry having had directed several award-winning short films like Pradhi and Nirangal Moondru before his feature film debut. He made his big screen debut through the 2016 film Dhuruvangal Pathinaaru which went on to become a sleeper hit.

Early life 
Karthick Naren was born in Coimbatore, Tamil Nadu to MNG Mani and Saradha Mani. A native of Ooty, he spent most of his life in Coimbatore. Naren completed his schooling at Lisieux Matriculation Higher Secondary School. He went on to join Mechanical Engineering at Kumaraguru College of Technology. He dropped out during his third year of Mechanical engineering course to pursue a career in filmmaking.

Film career 
Naren made his directorial debut at the age of 22 with the critically and commercially successful thriller Dhuruvangal Pathinaaru. Dhuruvangal Pathinaaru was bankrolled by his home banner Knight Nostalgia Filmotainment. The film crossed 100-days at the box office, becoming one of the highest grossing debut films in Tamil cinema. The film made Naren one of the most promising directors in Tamil Cinema.

Naren's sophomore project Naragasooran has an ensemble cast. Starring Arvind Swamy, Shriya Saran, Sundeep Kishan and Indrajith, the shoot of the film has been completed in 41 days. Naragasooran is produced by Badri Kasturi of Shradda Entertainment. The film has yet to see a theatrical release.

Karthick Naren's upcoming projects include Naadaga Medai under his banner Knight Nostalgia Filmotainment  and an untitled project starring S.T.R., produced by Vijaya Productions

Karthick Naren's next film is titled Maaran, starring Dhanush and Malavika Mohanan. He has also directed the segment ‘’Project Agni’’, as part of Navarasa, an anthology web series produced by Maniratnam and Jayendra Panchapakesan for Netflix.

Filmography

Directed features

Pilot/short films

Actor

Awards

International Indian Film Academy Awards

South Indian International Movie Awards

References

External links
 
	

Living people
Film directors from Tamil Nadu
Tamil film directors
Tamil-language film directors
1994 births